Monella (titled Frivolous Lola in the UK) is a 1998 Italian comedy-erotic film directed by Tinto Brass.

Plot
Lola (Anna Ammirati) is the teenage daughter of widow Zaira (Serena Grandi) living in a small Po Valley town (filming location is the comune of Pomponesco and Dosolo) in the 1950s. She is engaged to young Masetto (Max Parodi credited as Mario Parodi), who firmly believes in girls' virginity before marriage. They are soon to get married, but she is very much intrigued by sex, and further provoked by the antics of her libertine stepfather André (Patrick Mower), but Lola's approaches to Masetto for premarital sex jeopardise her relationship with him.

Cast

References

External links
 
 
 
 

1998 films
Italian sex comedy films
Commedia sexy all'italiana
1990s Italian-language films
1990s French-language films
1990s sex comedy films
Films directed by Tinto Brass
Films set in the 1950s
Films set in Italy
Films scored by Pino Donaggio
1998 comedy films
1990s Italian films